"Shadow of Your Love" is a song by Hollywood Rose later re-recorded by Guns N' Roses.

Shadow of Your Love may also refer to:
"Shadow of Your Love", a song by Ganggajang from The Essential
"Shadow of Your Love", a song by RAH Band from Mystery
"Shadow of Your Love", a song by 69 Eyes from Angels
"Shadow of Your Love", a song by The Temptations from Power

See also
"Shadows of Your Love", a song by J. M. Silk from Hold on to Your Dream